Leonel Ditutala Paulo (born 30 April 1986) is an Angolan basketball player and a member of the Angola national basketball team. He competed for Angola at the 2008 Summer Olympics. He stands .

He is currently playing for Petro Atlético at the Angolan major basketball league BAI Basket.

BAL career statistics

|-
|style="text-align:left;"|2021
|style="text-align:left;"|Petro de Luanda
| 6 || 1 || 15.3 || .447 || .182 || .429 || 2.5 || 1.5 || .5 || .2 || 6.5
|- class="sortbottom"
| style="text-align:center;" colspan="2"|Career
| 6 || 1 || 15.3 || .447 || .182 || .429 || 2.5 || 1.5 || .5 || .2 || 6.5

References

External links
 

1986 births
Living people
Angolan men's basketball players
Basketball players at the 2008 Summer Olympics
Olympic basketball players of Angola
Power forwards (basketball)
Atlético Petróleos de Luanda basketball players
C.D. Primeiro de Agosto men's basketball players
C.R.D. Libolo basketball players
African Games gold medalists for Angola
African Games medalists in basketball
2010 FIBA World Championship players
Competitors at the 2007 All-Africa Games
2019 FIBA Basketball World Cup players